Camptoplites is a genus of bryozoans belonging to the family Bugulidae.

The species of this genus are found in almost all world oceans.

Species:

Camptoplites abyssicolus 
Camptoplites angustus 
Camptoplites antarcticus 
Camptoplites areolatus 
Camptoplites asymmetricus 
Camptoplites atlanticus 
Camptoplites bicornis 
Camptoplites diaphanus 
Camptoplites giganteus 
Camptoplites latus 
Camptoplites lewaldi 
Camptoplites lunatus 
Camptoplites lutaudae 
Camptoplites marchemarchadi 
Camptoplites multispinosus 
Camptoplites notoscolophorus 
Camptoplites rectilinearis 
Camptoplites reticulatus 
Camptoplites retiformis 
Camptoplites tenuispinus 
Camptoplites tricornis 
Camptoplites tubiferus 
Camptoplites unicornis

References

Bryozoan genera